The following is a list of squads for each nation competing at UEFA Women's Euro 2013, an international football tournament held in Sweden from 10 July until 28 July 2013. The 12 national teams involved in the tournament were required to register a squad of 23 players; only players in these squads were eligible to take part in the tournament.

Before announcing their final squad for the tournament, teams were required to name a preliminary squad of 40 players by 10 June 2013, 30 days before the start of the tournament. The preliminary squad would then have to be cut to a final 23, three of which had to be goalkeepers, by 30 June 2013 (midnight CET). Replacement of seriously injured players is permitted until immediately before the team in question's first game, though replacement players must be drawn from the preliminary squad of 40.

The squads were published on 3 July 2013, with Russia being the only national squad made up entirely of players from home-based clubs, while Iceland named the most foreign-based players with 13.

Players marked (c) were named as captain for their national squad.

Number of caps, players' club teams and players' age as of 10 July 2013: the tournament's opening day.

Group A

Denmark
The squad was announced on 21 June 2013. Goalkeeper Heidi Johansen missed out with a knee injury. Katrine Pedersen, the most capped active player in Europe, was included.

Head coach: Kenneth Heiner-Møller

Finland
A preliminary squad was announced on 3 June 2013, followed by the final selection on 28 June 2013. Striker Linda Sällström and captain Maija Saari both missed out through injury.

Head coach:  Andrée Jeglertz

Italy
The squad was announced on 1 July 2013. Elisabetta Tona was injured and replaced by Federica Di Criscio on 9 July 2013.

Head coach: Antonio Cabrini

Sweden
The squad was announced on 25 June 2013.

Head coach: Pia Sundhage

Group B

Germany
The squad was announced on 20 June 2013. Babett Peter, Verena Faißt, Viola Odebrecht, Kim Kulig, Alexandra Popp and Linda Bresonik all withdrew from the provisional squad due to injury or illness.

Head coach: Silvia Neid

Iceland
The squad was announced on 24 June 2013. Thirteen of the 23 named players had also been in the squad for UEFA Women's Euro 2009. Sisters Elísa and Margrét Lára Viðarsdóttir were both included. On 4 July Katrín Ásbjörnsdóttir was replaced by Soffía Arnþrúður Gunnarsdóttir.

Head coach: Siggi Eyjólfsson

Netherlands
The squad was announced on 30 June 2013. The following day, Mandy van den Berg was ruled out with a knee injury and Merel van Dongen called up as a replacement. Marlous Pieëte left the squad after a knee ligament injury and was replaced by Maayke Heuver.

Head coach: Roger Reijners

Norway
The squad was announced on 13 June 2013. Injured forwards Isabell Herlovsen and Cecilie Pedersen were notable absentees.

Head coach: Even Pellerud

Group C

England
The squad was announced on 17 June 2013.

Head coach: Hope Powell

France
The squad was announced on 31 May 2013. Laëtitia Tonazzi withdrew from the squad on 19 June 2013.

Head coach: Bruno Bini

Russia
The squad was announced on 1 July 2013.

Head coach: Sergei Lavrentyev

Spain
The squad was announced on 29 June 2013.

Head coach: Ignacio Quereda

References

External links

Squads
2013